Violon et Raisins (English: Violin and Grapes) is a 1912 oil on canvas painting by Pablo Picasso. This painting was one of five works exhibited by the artist at Galerie Goltz, Munich, along with Tête de femme. It is now in the Museum of Modern Art in New York City.

References

External links
 Violon et raisins at MoMA

Paintings by Pablo Picasso
1912 paintings
Still life paintings
Musical instruments in art
Paintings in the collection of the Museum of Modern Art (New York City)
Cubist paintings